The 303rd Station Hospital was a World War II hospital established in the grounds of Lilford Hall in Northamptonshire, England in September 1943 as a 750-bed hospital to provide medical attention to wounded men returning from combat. The hospital was expanded to a 1,500-bed hospital after D-day. The original commanding officer was Major Thompson followed by Colonels Smith, Abramson and Ragan. Seventy-five nurses had accommodations at the nearby Lilford Hall. The hospital was disbanded in May 1945.

References 

Hospitals in Northamptonshire
Hospital buildings completed in 1943
Hospitals established in 1943
1945 disestablishments in the United Kingdom
Defunct hospitals in England
1943 establishments in England